Halanaerobacter jeridensis is an obligatory anaerobic and moderately halophilic bacterium from the genus of Halanaerobacter which has been isolated from the Jerid lake in Tunisia.

References

Clostridia
Bacteria described in 2012